Fargo is an unincorporated community in Morrow County, in the U.S. state of Ohio.

History
Fargo was originally called Olmsteadville, and under the latter name was platted in 1838 by Francis C. Olmstead, and named for him. The community was later called Morton's Corners, after a family who kept a store there. Morton's Corners eventually became known as Fargo. A post office was established under the Fargo name in 1893, and remained in operation until 1904.

References

Unincorporated communities in Morrow County, Ohio
1838 establishments in Ohio
Populated places established in 1838
Unincorporated communities in Ohio